Amélie was a 46-gun  of the French Navy.

On 21 October 1809, she sailed from Toulon to escort a convoy bound for Barcelona. Chased by a British squadron under Collingwood during the Battle of Maguelone, she managed to escape to Marseille in spite of a broken bowsprit, and eventually reached Toulon on 3 November.

On 29 March 1811, she departed Toulon with Adrienne, escorting the storeship Dromadaire carrying 8 tonnes of gunpowder and ammunition to Corfu. Two days later, the ships ran across a British squadron comprising HMS Unite and HMS Ajax. Dromadaire was captured, while the frigates managed to escape to Portoferraio.

At the Bourbon Restoration, she was renamed Junon, effective from 11 April 1814.

She served during the Spanish expedition under Captain Rosamel, capturing a privateer on 3 March 1823 and fighting off Barcelona.

She served as a transport in Madagascar, then was re-armed in the Mediterranean, before being struck in 1842.

Sources and references

References

Age of Sail frigates of France
Pallas-class frigates (1808)
Ships built in France
1808 ships